Andimadam (Tamil: ஆண்டிமடம்), is a town in Tamil Nadu. It is one of the blocks in the Ariyalur district.

Andimadam may also refer to:
 Andimadam, a town in Tamil Nadu
 Andimadam (state assembly constituency), a legislative assembly constituency
 Andimadam Block, a revenue block of Ariyalur district